Juan Vicente Villacorta Díaz (January 22, 1764 in Zacatecoluca, El Salvador – November 1, 1828 in Guatemala) was a Central American politician. From July 10, 1823, to March 15, 1824, he was a member of the triumvirates that governed the Federal Republic of Central America. From December 13, 1824, to November 1, 1826, he was head of state of El Salvador, while it was a state of the Central American Federation.

Villacorta was a member of the assembly that met in San Salvador in 1821. He was among the signers of the declaration of independence of Central America and a member of the constituent congress of the United Provinces of Central America in 1823. He formed part of the Supreme Executive Power of the Federation (the First and Second Triumvirates) in 1823–24.

Villacorta became chief of state of El Salvador on December 13, 1824. Mariano Prado was vice chief of state. Villacorta sent 500 troops to help federal President General Manuel José Arce suppress a rebellion in Nicaragua. On April 20, 1825, he introduced the papel sellado, the use of seals on official documents such as contracts, judicial decrees, deeds, etc. A tax was charged for the seals. The same month, he denounced the writings of the Archbishop of Guatemala, Fray Ramón Casaus y Torres, who argued against the recognition of Padre José Matías Delgado as archbishop of San Salvador. As a result, Federal president Arce admonished Casaus, and he suspended his attacks on Delgado.

In 1826 Villacorta approved a decree of the Legislature giving preference for entry into the military academy to sons of individuals who had died in defense of the fatherland in the years 1811, 1814, 1822 and 1823. In October 1826 he sent 300 troops to Guatemala to aid federal President Manuel José Arce. During his administration, El Semanario Político Mercantil was published in El Salvador.

On November 1, 1828, Villacorta died in Guatemala.

External links
 Short biography
 Some biographical details

1764 births
1828 deaths
People from La Paz Department (El Salvador)
Salvadoran people of Spanish descent
Salvadoran politicians
Heads of state of the Federal Republic of Central America